Liz Duggan retired as Archdeacon of Central Otago in 2015 having served since 2009.

References

Archdeacons of Central Otago
Living people
Year of birth missing (living people)
Place of birth missing (living people)
21st-century New Zealand women